Coccomyxaceae is a family of algae, in the class Trebouxiophyceae.

References

External links

Scientific references

Scientific databases
 AlgaTerra database
 Index Nominum Genericorum

Chlorophyceae families
Trebouxiophyceae